Telfair may refer to:

People

Given name
Telfair Hodgson (1840–1893), American academic administrator
Telfair Hodgson Jr. (1876–1952), American academic administrator, banker, developer

Surname
 Charles Telfair (1778–1833), Irish botanist
 Edward Telfair (1735–1807), multi-term governor of Georgia, U.S. 
 Mary Telfair (1791–1875), benefactor of Savannah's Telfair Museums and Mary Telfair Women's Hospital
 Richard Telfair, pen-name of American writer Richard Jessup (1925–1982)
 Sebastian Telfair (born 1985), American basketball player
 Thomas Telfair (1786–1818), United States Representative from Georgia

Places
 Charles Telfair Institute, a tertiary education institution in Mauritius
 Telfair County, Georgia
 Telfair Museums, the first art museum in the American South, in Savannah GA
 Telfair Academy, early 19th-century building housing historic art 
 Telfair Arms Apartments, formerly Telfair Hospital
 Telfair, Sugar Land, a community in Texas

Ships
 USS Telfair (APA-210), a Haskell-class attack transport
 Gussie Telfair, a merchant steamship built in 1862, formerly USS Gertrude

Other uses
 Telfair's skink, a Mauritian lizard